Georgi Zografski (also known as Đorđe Zografski; Papradište, Čaška, Ottoman Empire, 1871– Skopje, SFR Yugoslavia, 1945) was an artist active in the Ottoman Empire, Bulgaria, Serbia, Russia and Yugoslavia in the first half of the twentieth century.

Biography
He was born to a family of Aromanian origin and went on to spend a good part of his life in Serbia, Niš. Zograf largely painted icons and frescoes in the town of Niš and surrounding region. He later worked in Surdulica and Kuršumlija with his father who was also an artist. While in Nis, he painted several portraits which disappeared after the World war. He also collaborated with Dušan Miletić at the Church of St. Pantelemion in Niš.

In 2011, one of his paintings from 1910, was discovered. It was a group portrait of a merchant family. The portrait was seriously damaged by bomb shrapnel during the bombardment of Niš during World War II (4 April 1944) and was in need of significant restoration work.

Zografski died in 1945 in Skopje. In 1963 his remains were reburied in Veles, North Macedonia.

References 

1871 births
1945 deaths
Serbian artists